Hasić is a Bosnian surname. Notable people with this surname include:

 Ajdin Hasić (born 2001), Bosnian footballer
 Ermin Hasić (born 1975), Bosnian-Slovenian footballer
 Jasmin Hasić, Bosnian boxer
 Šerif Hasić (born 1988), Bosnian footballer

See also
 Donji Hasić, Bosnia-Herzegovina
 Gornji Hasić, Bosnia-Herzegovina